The Ecuadorian squirrel monkey (Saimiri cassiquiarensis macrodon) is a type of squirrel monkey.  It had been considered a subspecies of the Guianan squirrel monkey, Saimiri sciureus, but was elevated to a full species, S. macrodon, based on a 2009 study by Carretero-Pinzón, et al.  Based on subsequent genetic research by Jessica Lynch Alfaro, et al it was again reclassified as a subspecies of Humboldt's squirrel monkey.

The Ecuadorian squirrel monkey lives in the western Brazilian Amazon, as well as southern Colombia, eastern Ecuador and northern and eastern Peru. It lives in humid tropical and subtropical forest, preferring dense forest but able to live in secondary forest and disturbed forest as well.

Its coloration is similar to that of the Guianan squirrel monkey but its fur is darker.

References

Squirrel monkeys
Mammals described in 1907
Taxa named by Daniel Giraud Elliot
Primates of South America
Mammals of Brazil
Mammals of Colombia
Mammals of Peru
Mammals of Ecuador